Aplococeras is an evolute discoidal ceratitid ammonite from the Middle Triassic Ladinian stage, found in southern Europe and Nevada. Whorl sides are convex, converging on a rounded venter (the outer rim), and are ornamented with slightly flexuous umbilical ribs that disappear outwardly, towards the venter. The suture has two lateral lobes (on either side).

Apleuroceras and Velebites are related genera also from the Ladinian (Middle Triassic).

References 

 Arkel,et al, 1957. Mesozoic Ammonoidea; Treatise in Invertebrate Paleontology Part L (L158). Geological Society of America and University Kansas Press.
 Paleobiology Database Aplococeras entry accessed 9 December 2011

Aplococeratidae
Middle Triassic ammonites
Ceratitida genera
Triassic ammonites of North America
Middle Triassic life